The 1942 Farmers and Mechanics Savings Bank building in downtown Minneapolis, Minnesota, United States, is a former bank building that is now the home of a Westin Hotel.  The building is an example of the Streamline Moderne phase of the Art Deco movement and is notable for its bold relief sculptures of a farmer and a mechanic framing the main entrance.  The sculptures were designed by Warren T. Mosman, who headed the sculpture department at the Minneapolis Institute of Arts. The structure was listed on the National Register of Historic Places in 2006.

The previous Farmers and Mechanics Savings Bank headquarters was built in 1891 on 115 S. 4th St.  It is now home to The Downtown Cabaret, a strip club.

The walnut-paneled main banking hall of the building is now the lobby of the hotel. The taller wings of the building once held offices, but now house 214 hotel rooms. The hotel conversion preserved several historic features of the bank building. The bank's boardroom on the 10th floor, with floor-to-ceiling windows, is now a conference room. The original bank vault on the lower level is also a conference room, while the former safety deposit vault is now a wine vault and the entire bank has been made into a restaurant, called B.A.N.K.  The restaurant kept as much of the original woodworking from the actual bank as possible. Former offices now serve as private dining rooms and the teller counter now serves as a bar.

References

National Register of Historic Places in Minneapolis
Commercial buildings completed in 1942
Art Deco architecture in Minnesota
Streamline Moderne architecture in Minnesota
Bank buildings on the National Register of Historic Places in Minnesota
1942 establishments in Minnesota